President University is an international private university located in the Jababeka Industrial Estate, the largest industrial area in Southeast Asia. PresUniv was founded in 2001 by national entrepreneur Dr. (HC) SD Darmono, the founder of the Jababeka Group and Prof. Dr. Juwono Sudarsono, an academic who has held various ministerial positions such as Minister of Environment, Minister of Education and Culture to Minister of Defense. Several figures also contributed in formulating PresUniv to become an international university, such as legal expert Prof. Dr. Charles Himawan, SH, LLM, Ir. Admiral Sukardi (Minister of State for Investment and Empowerment of SOEs (1999-2001) and Minister of SOEs (2001-2004)), Drs. Utomo Josodirjo, who is known as the Father of Indonesian Accounting, entrepreneur Surjanto Sosrodjojo, and Prof. Donald Watts from the University of Notre Dame, Australia.

PresUniv is an international university, which is why it offers lectures in English as part of its academic program. Furthermore, some of PresUniv's lecturers are also foreign lecturers, and about 10% of the students are international students from different countries who come from all over the world. The rest of the Indonesian students who study at PresUniv come from various provinces. The existence of foreign lecturers and students, including students from various provinces, bringing their respective traditions, culture and habits contribute to building the character of education at PresUniv that is open and tolerant.

PresUniv's location in the Jababeka industrial area is also very supportive of an international climate. The industrial area is home to more than 1,750 national and international or multinational companies. These companies also become organic laboratories for PresUniv lecturers and students. Lecturers can do research, and students can do internships in these companies.

Since 2018, PresUniv has been accredited A from the National Accreditation Board for Higher Education (BAN-PT) and at the same time became the 78th university in Indonesia to be accredited A, together with several other state universities. Currently, PresUniv has 17 undergraduate programs and 2 postgraduate programs. 50% of the study programs at PresUniv have also been accredited A, and the rest B.

PresUniv, under the auspices of the President University Foundation (YPUP), is currently led by Prof. Dr. Ir. Chairy, SE, MM, as Rector. Meanwhile, YPUP is led by Prof. Dr. Ir. Budi Susilo Soepandji, DEA, an academic who has served as Governor of the National Resilience Institute (2011-2016).

To support its lecture activities, PresUniv provides dormitories and apartments located not far from campus, namely President University Student Housing (PUSH), Elvis Tower apartments, and New Beverly Hills. In addition, PresUniv also provides bicycles and buses as means of transportation that students can access free of charge.

Facilities 
President University has:

 International Curriculum - President University implements an international standard curriculum.
 English-Speaking Environment - All courses are presented with an English introduction. Students will be accustomed to speaking, writing, and thinking in English, which is today's international language.
 Student Extracurriculars: President University provides facilities that support student activities such as the President Executive Club, Jababeka Golf and Country Club, swimming pools, tennis courts, soccer fields, basketball courts.
 Multinational Community - President University students come from all corners of Indonesia and abroad, such as China, Vietnam, and Laos.
 Work Experience - President University provides an internship program for a maximum of 2 semesters for all students to prepare students for a career path.

President University also provides various facilities to support student activities, such as:

 President Executive Club
 Jababeka Golf and Country Club
 Olympic Swimming Pool
 Tennis court
 Soccer field
 Basketball court
 President University Convention Center
 Charles Himawan Auditorium
 library
 Laboratory

The History 
President University was conceptualized by Dr. (HC) Setyono Djuandi Darmono while still serving as President Director of PT Jababeka Tbk. and Prof. Donald W. Watts as President of Bond University (Queensland) and Deputy Advisor to Curtin University in Western Australia. Several prominent figures in Indonesia were also involved in finalizing the concept of the President University, such as Prof. Dr. Juwono Sudarsono (academic who has served as Minister of the Environment, Minister of Education and Culture to Minister of Defense), legal expert Prof. Dr. Charles Himawan, SH, LLM, Ir. Admiral Sukardi (Minister of State for Investment and Empowerment of SOEs (1999-2001) and Minister of SOEs (2001-2004)), Drs. Utomo Josodirjo (Father of Indonesian Accounting), and national entrepreneur Surjanto Sosrodjojo.

At first, President University in 2021 still officially used the name Sekolah Tinggi Teknik (STT) Cikarang. However, the concept of lectures and curriculum had implemented an international standard university curriculum at that time. The President University obtained a new university from the Ministry of National Education on April 16, 2004.

Undergraduate programs 
Currently, President University has four faculties, namely Faculty of Business, Faculty of Computer Science, Faculty of Engineering, and Faculty of Humanities.

Faculty of Business 

 Accounting
 Business Administration
 Management
 Actuarial Science

Faculty of Engineering 

 Civil Engineering
 Industrial Engineering
 Mechanical Engineering
 Electrical Engineering
 Environmental Engineering

Faculty of Computer Science 

 Visual Communication Design
 Information Technology
 Information System

Faculty of Humanities 

 International Relations
 Communication
 Law
 Primary School Teacher Education

Postgraduate Programs 

 Master in Information Technology
 Master of Technology Management

Study Program Accreditation

References

External links
 Official website

Educational institutions established in 2001
Universities in Indonesia
Universities in West Java
Private universities and colleges in Indonesia
2001 establishments in Indonesia